Malek Aït Alia (born August 15, 1977 in Mulhouse, France) is a former footballer who played as a defender for various French clubs and Algerian side USM Alger. Born in France, he represented Algeria at international level.

International career
On April 24, 2003, Aït-Alia made his debut for the Algerian National Team as a starter in a 3-1 friendly win over Madagascar. On April 28, 2004, he played his second game, starting in a 1-0 loss in a friendly against China.

National team statistics

References

1977 births
Living people
Algerian footballers
Algeria international footballers
Amiens SC players
Clermont Foot players
FC Mulhouse players
Association football defenders
French footballers
French sportspeople of Algerian descent
Kabyle people
Ligue 2 players
Montpellier HSC players
Footballers from Mulhouse
Racing Club de France Football players
Stade de Reims players
Stade Lavallois players
USM Alger players
Algerian expatriate footballers